Matriz  is a parish in the district of Ribeira Grande in the Azores. The population in 2011 was 3,968, in an area of 10.84 km². It is situated on the north coast of the island. Together with the parish Conceição, it forms the town Ribeira Grande. It contains the localities Bairro de Santa Luzia, Caldeiras and Matriz.

References

Parishes of Ribeira Grande, Azores